Giovanni M. "John" DiSanto is an American politician from Pennsylvania currently serving as a Republican member of the Pennsylvania State Senator for the 15th district since 2017. His district is based in the state capital of Harrisburg.

Early life and education
DiSanto was born in Harrisburg area and graduated from Central Dauphin High School. He received a Bachelor's degree in Business Administration with an emphasis in Urban Planning from American University.

Career
Before his election to the State Senate in 2016, DiSanto was president of a construction and development company. He defeated Rob Teplitz in a heated contest for the 15th district.

Committee assignments 

 Banking & Insurance, Chair
 Urban Affairs & Housing, Vice Chair
 Education
 Labor & Industry
 Transportation

References

External links
John DiSanto for State Senate
Senator-elect John DiSanto

21st-century American politicians
American University alumni
Living people
Republican Party Pennsylvania state senators
Year of birth missing (living people)
Date of birth missing (living people)

Politicians from Dauphin County, Pennsylvania